Ciobann Marian is a Romanian sprint canoer who competed in the late 1970s. He won a bronze medal in the K-4 10000 m at the 1978 ICF Canoe Sprint World Championships in Belgrade.

References

Living people
Romanian male canoeists
Year of birth missing (living people)
ICF Canoe Sprint World Championships medalists in kayak